Nuciferine is an alkaloid found within the plants Nymphaea caerulea and Nelumbo nucifera.

Preliminary psychopharmacological research in 1978 was unable to conclusively determine the compound's classification in regards to dopamine-receptor activity. On one hand, investigative studies found evidence of behavior traditionally associated with dopamine-receptor stimulation: stereotypy, increase in spontaneous motor activity, inhibition of conditioned avoidance response, and an increase in pain sensitivity resulting in an inhibition of morphine analgesia. On the other hand, these early investigative studies also found evidence of behavior traditionally associated with dopamine-receptor blockade: decrease of spontaneous motor activity, chills,  catalepsy, trance-like states of consciousness.

Nuciferine may also potentiate morphine analgesia. The median lethal dose in mice is 289 mg/kg. It is structurally related to apomorphine.

Nuciferine has been reported to have various anti-inflammatory possibly via PPAR delta activation Nuciferine suppresses the SOX2-AKT/STAT3 signaling pathway in animal models. Targeting SOX-2 pathways in human models with Nuciferine may offer a novel therapeutic approach for cancer treatment.

See also

References 

Phenol ethers
Aporphine alkaloids
Dopamine receptor modulators